Dongqian Lake is a large freshwater lake in Yinzhou District, Ningbo in Zhejiang, China.

References

Lakes of Zhejiang
Tourist attractions in Ningbo
Yinzhou District, Ningbo